Morgunov is a Russian masculine surname, its feminine counterpart is Morgunova. It may refer to
Aleksandr Morgunov (born 1995), Russian football midfielder
Aleksei Morgunov (1884 - 1935), Russian avant-garde painter
Lyubov Morgunova (born 1971), Russian long-distance runner
Nikita Morgunov (born 1975), Russian basketball player
Nina Morgunova (born 1951), Russian middle-distance runner
Sergey Morgunov (pilot) (1918-1946), Soviet flying ace
Sergey Morgunov (athlete) (born 1993), Russian long jumper
Yevgeny Morgunov (1927–1999), Russian actor

Russian-language surnames